Tom Vandendriessche is a Belgian politician and businessman currently serving as a Member of the European Parliament for the Vlaams Belang.

Vandendriessche holds a master's degree in political sciences and a master's degree in business economics from Ghent University and worked in business before becoming a press attaché for the Europe of Nations and Freedom group in the European Parliament. In 2019, Patsy Vatlet was elected as an MEP for Belgium but the chair of his party (Tom Van Grieken) chose to replace her with Tom Vandendriessche.

References

Living people
MEPs for Belgium 2019–2024
Vlaams Belang MEPs
1978 births